A deep-fried Oreo is a dessert or snack consisting of a chocolate sandwich cookie which is dipped in batter and deep fried. It may be served with different toppings, most commonly powdered sugar. Deep-fried Oreos are generally made using Oreo-brand cookies, hence the name, but other chocolate sandwich cookies can be used.

Origin
Deep-fried Oreos were introduced in 2001 by Charlie Boghosian, also known as "Chicken Charlie" or "The Man Who Fries Everything," a 16-year-old Armenian settled in the United States, at the L.A. County Fair. Boghosian dipped Oreos in pancake batter, deep fried them, drizzled them with chocolate syrup and served them with powdered sugar. "There are many other fried foods at the fair, but I specialize in it. I make it my life," Boghosian said about deep-fried food. Aside from the deep-fried Oreo, he has also introduced new types of deep-fried food every year in different state fairs.

Since the debut of the deep-fried Oreo, it has now become very common at carnivals and is a "cult favorite."

Preparation
 Deep-fried Oreos are made with Oreo cookies, batter (usually made from buttermilk pancake mix and water), vegetable oil, and powdered sugar.

Before preparation, the cookies are frozen for 3 hours. To begin, the oil is preheated to 350 degrees Fahrenheit. After that, the buttermilk pancake mix is stirred with the water in a mixing bowl to make the batter. The cookies are fully coated in the batter and then deep fried until golden brown. The cookies are removed from the oil and placed on a sheet pan with paper towels to drain away excess oil. The tops of the deep-fried Oreos are then dusted with powdered sugar.

Variations
Numerous variations of deep-fried Oreos have been derived from the typical recipe since its debut, including bacon deep-fried Oreos (deep-fried Oreos which are wrapped in slices of bacon); deep-fried Oreo ice cream, in which ice cream covered with egg mixture and crushed Oreo cookies is deep fried; and deep-fried Oreo burgers, which take the form of a deep-fried Oreo within a burger (including the patty) alongside other fillings, such as bacon.

Reception
In 2013, the deep-fried Oreo won the Annual Big Tex Choice in the State Fair of Texas.

Popular culture 
Deep-fried Oreos were also introduced on TV shows and viral videos by some celebrities. In 2012, a popular Taiwanese variety show by the name of Kangsi Coming also publicized the deep-fried Oreo. In the programme, an American talked about deep-fried Oreos, referring to it as one of the most popular foods in Taiwanese night markets.

In 2013, on The Jay Leno Show, Kim Kardashian cooked deep-fried Oreos with Guy Fieri and said about it: "It's like a once-a-year snack."

Yuka Kinoshita, a famous Japanese competitive eater, filmed a YouTube video of herself eating over 30 deep-fried Oreos in 2016. The video has exceeded 3 million views. In February of 2023 Adam of the BeardMeatsFood channel finished 61 deep fried Oreos in a restaurant in Tennessee

Location
The deep-fried Oreo has become worldwide since its debut in 2002 at the Los Angeles County Fair and Texas State Fair. Outside of its birthplace, the United States, the deep-fried Oreo has been available in different countries all over the world, including Australia, Canada, Dubai, Hong Kong, the Philippines, Singapore, Taiwan, Thailand, and the United Kingdom.

Health concerns
Deep-fried foods have been criticized for being linked to various health problems, since they are usually high in calories, fat (including saturated fat), and cholesterol. For instance, the saturated fat and trans fat in deep-fried foods increase the risk of high cholesterol, heart disease, cancer and obesity. As such, deep-fried Oreos have aroused health controversies. Five deep-fried Oreos contain 900 calories and have a total of 51 grams of sugar, 950 mg of sodium, and 48 grams of fat.

Deep-fried Oreos are included in a junk food encyclopedia titled Fast Food and Junk Food: An Encyclopedia of What We Love to Eat by Andrew F. Smith.

See also

 List of deep fried foods

References

Oreo
Oreo
American desserts
Deep Fried Oreos